The 1962 Minnesota Golden Gophers football team represented the University of Minnesota in the 1962 Big Ten Conference football season. In their ninth year under head coach Murray Warmath, the Golden Gophers compiled a 6–2–1 record and outscored their opponents by a combined total of 131 to 61. The team finished tenth in both the Associated Press and United Press International polls. 
 
Tackle Bobby Bell received the team's Most Valuable Player award and the Outland Trophy. Bell, guard Julian Hook and end John Campbell were named All-Big Ten first team. Tackle Carl Eller and defensive end Bob Prawdzik were named All-Big Ten second team.

Total attendance at six home games was 377,744, an average of 62,957 per game. The largest crowd was against Purdue.

Schedule

Roster
 Carl Eller, Jr.

References

Minnesota
Minnesota Golden Gophers football seasons
Minnesota Golden Gophers football